Sphaerophoria rueppellii is a European species of hoverfly.

References

External links
External images

Diptera of Europe
Syrphini
Insects described in 1820